San Juan Bautista Tlacoatzintepec is a town and municipality in Oaxaca in south-western Mexico. The municipality covers an area of 183.7 km². 
It is part of Cuicatlán District in the north of the Cañada Region.

As of 2005, the municipality had a total population of 2241.

References

Municipalities of Oaxaca